Red Oak High School is a 5A high school located in Red Oak, Texas, United States. It is part of the Red Oak Independent School District located in far north central Ellis County.  In 2012, the school was rated "Academically Acceptable" by the Texas Education Agency.

The Red Oak ISD has recently built a new facility for the school, located west and across the street from the current school.  The new school also connects to nearby Texas State Highway 342, the main north-south highway through Red Oak.

Athletics
The Red Oak Hawks compete in the following sports -

Cross Country, Volleyball, Football, Basketball, Powerlifting, Soccer, Golf, Tennis, Track, Swimming, Baseball & Softball.

State titles
Boys Soccer - 
2003(4A)
Volleyball - 
1992(4A), 1995(4A), 2002(4A)
One Act Play - 
1986(3A)

Notable alumni
 Nikki Stringfield - American heavy metal singer and guitarist
 Louise Ritter - 1988 Olympic gold medalist, high jump
 Michelle Carter - National high school record holder in shot put, 2016 Olympic gold medalist
 Sarah Jaffe - Singer-songwriter signed to Kirtland Records
 Scott Walker - Judge of the Texas Court of Criminal Appeals
 Demi Burnett - The Bachelor contestant
 Marcus Sasser, collegiate basketball player for the Houston Cougars

References

External links
 

Schools in Ellis County, Texas
Public high schools in Texas